The Graduate School and University Center of the City University of New York (CUNY Graduate Center) is a public research institution and post-graduate university in New York City.  Serving as the principal doctorate-granting institution of the City University of New York (CUNY) system, The CUNY Graduate Center is classified among "R1: Doctoral Universities – Very High Research Activity". The school is situated in the landmark B. Altman and Company Building at 365 Fifth Avenue in Midtown Manhattan, opposite the Empire State Building. The CUNY Graduate Center has 4,600 students, 31 doctoral programs, 14 master's programs, and 30 research centers and institutes. A core faculty of approximately 140 is supplemented by over 1,800 additional faculty members drawn from throughout CUNY's eleven senior colleges and New York City's cultural and scientific institutions.

CUNY Graduate Center faculty include recipients of the Nobel Prize, the Abel Prize, Pulitzer Prize, the National Humanities Medal, the National Medal of Science, the National Endowment for the Humanities, the Rockefeller Fellowship, the Schock Prize, the Bancroft Prize, the Wolf Prize, Grammy Awards, the George Jean Nathan Award for Dramatic Criticism, Guggenheim Fellowships, the New York City Mayor's Award for Excellence in Science and Technology, the Presidential Early Career Awards for Scientists and Engineers, and memberships in the American Academy of Arts and Sciences and the National Academy of Sciences. 

Several doctoral programs at the CUNY Graduate Center, including Criminal Justice, English, History, Philosophy, and Sociology, have been ranked among the top 30 in the United States. For the Fall 2022 semester, 16% of applicants across all doctoral programs at the CUNY Graduate Center were offered admission.

In addition to academics, the CUNY Graduate Center extends its intellectual and cultural resources to the general public, offering access to a wide range of events, including lectures, symposia, performances, and workshops.

History

CUNY began offering doctoral education through its Division of Graduate Studies in 1961, and awarded its first two Ph.D.s to Daniel Robinson and Barbara Stern in 1965. Robinson, formerly a professor of philosophy at the University of Oxford, received his Ph.D. in psychology, while Stern, late of Rutgers University, received her Ph.D. in English literature.

In 1969, the Division of Graduate Studies formally became the Graduate School and University Center. Mathematician Mina S. Rees served as the institution's first president from 1969 until her retirement in 1972. Rees was succeeded as president of the Graduate Center by environmental psychologist Harold M. Proshansky, who served until his death in 1990. Provost Steven M. Cahn was named acting president in Spring 1991. Psychologist Frances Degen Horowitz was appointed president in September, 1991. In 2005, Horowitz was succeeded by the school's provost, Professor of English Literature William P. Kelly.

During Kelly's tenure at the Graduate Center, the university saw significant growth in revenue, funding opportunities for students, increased Distinguished Faculty and a general resurgence. This is in accordance with three primary goals articulated in the Graduate Center's strategic plan. The first of these involves enhancing student support. In 2013, 83 dissertation-year fellowships were awarded at a total cost of $1.65 million. The Graduate Center is also developing new programs to advance research prior to the dissertation phase, including archival work. The fiscal stability of the university has enabled the chancellery to increase, on an incremental basis, the value of these fellowships. The packages extended for 2013-14 year increase stipends and reduce teaching requirements. In 2001, the Graduate Center provided 14 million dollars in student support, and, in Fall 2013, 51 million in student support.

On April 23, 2013, the CUNY Board of Trustees announced that President Kelly would serve as interim chancellor for the City University of New York beginning July 1 with the retirement of Chancellor Matthew Goldstein. GC Provost Chase F. Robinson, a historian, was appointed to serve as interim president of the Graduate Center in 2013, and then served as president from July 2014 to December 2018.

Joy Connolly became provost in August 2016 and interim president in December 2018. Julia Wrigley was appointed as interim provost in December 2018. In July 2019, James Muyskens became interim president, as Connolly had been appointed president of the American Council of Learned Societies. On March 30, 2020, Robin L. Garrell, Vice Provost for Graduate Education and Dean of Graduate Division at University of California, Los Angeles, was announced as the next president of The Graduate Center. She assumed office on August 1, 2020.

Steve Everett assumed the position of Provost and Senior Vice President in August 2021.

Campus 
The CUNY Graduate Center's main campus is located in the B. Altman and Company Building at 34th Street and Fifth Avenue in the Midtown Manhattan neighborhood of New York City. CUNY shares the B. Altman Building with the Oxford University Press. The CUNY Graduate Center has occupied its current location since 2000, before which it was housed in Aeolian Hall on West 42nd Street across from the New York Public Library Main Branch. In 2017, the CUNY Advanced Science Research Center at 85 St. Nicholas Terrace in Manhattan's Harlem neighborhood became part of the CUNY Graduate Center.

Advanced Science Research Center 
The Advanced Science Research Center at the Graduate Center (CUNY ASRC) is an interdisciplinary STEM center for research and discovery that leverages expertise across five increasingly interconnected fields: nanoscience, photonics, structural biology, neuroscience, and environmental science. The CUNY ASRC aims to enhance STEM education and promote a collaborative research culture, one where scientists from different fields can work side by side in the center's core facilities, pursuing new research that yields practical benefits for society. It is located in a state-of-the-art, 200,000-square-foot building on the southern edge of City College's campus in Upper Manhattan.

The CUNY ASRC, which opened its doors in September 2014 is an outgrowth of CUNY's “Decade of Science” initiative, a 10-year-long, multibillion-dollar commitment to elevating science research and education.

The CUNY ASRC formally joined the CUNY Graduate Center in spring 2017. Today, the CUNY ASRC serves as a hub for CUNY's integrated research network across the five boroughs of New York City. Five years after the center opened, over 200 graduate, undergraduate, and high school students had been mentored by CUNY ASRC scientists. In that time, the center also hosted over 400 conferences, seminars, and workshops and awarded over $600,000 in seed grants to CUNY faculty.

Research initiatives 
The CUNY ASRC was founded on the principle that the next great scientific advances will result from the interaction of researchers across different disciplines. Thus, the center integrates five diverse research fields to encourage collaboration among established scientists, early-career researchers, and students in areas that shape 21st-century global science.

 Nanoscience: Exploring on the tiniest scale, using the living world for inspiration to create new materials and devices that advance fields ranging from biomedicine to energy production
 Photonics: Discovering new ways to control light, heat, radio waves, and sound for future optical computers, ultrasensitive cameras, and cell phone technology
 Structural biology: Combining physics and chemistry to explore biology at the molecular and cellular levels, with the intention of identifying new ways to treat diseases
 Neuroscience: Investigating how the brain senses and responds to environmental and social experiences, with a focus on neural networks, metabolic changes, and molecular signals occurring in brain cells, with the goal of developing biosensors and innovative solutions to promote mental health
 Environmental sciences: Developing high-tech, interdisciplinary solutions to urgent environmental challenges, including air and water issues, climate change, and disease transmission

Each research initiative occupies one floor of the CUNY ASRC building that hosts four faculty laboratories and between two and four core facilities.

Core facilities 
The CUNY ASRC houses 15 individual core facilities containing a wide array of cutting-edge equipment. These facilities are open to researchers from CUNY, other academic institutions, nonprofit organizations, and for-profit companies. The CUNY ASRC welcomes researchers from the New York metropolitan area as well as from across the country and globe.

The facilities include:

 Advanced Laboratory for Chemical and Isotopic Signatures (ALCIS) Facility
 Biomolecular Nuclear Magnetic Resonance (NMR) Facility
 Comparative Medicine Unit (CMU)
 Epigenetics Facilities
 Imaging Facility
 Live Imaging & Bioenergetics Facility
 MALDI Imaging Joint Facility
 Magnetic Resonance Imaging (MRI) Facility
 Macromolecular Crystallization Facility
 Mass Spectrometry Core Facility
 Nanofabrication Facility
 Next Generation Environmental Sensor (NGENS) Lab
 Photonics Core Facility
 Radio Frequency and mm Wave Facility
 Surface Science Facility

Education and outreach

The CUNY ASRC promotes science education throughout CUNY, New York City, and well beyond. Students from CUNY's community and senior colleges participate in research opportunities during the academic year and over the summer through programs such as the CUNY Summer Undergraduate Research Program. Likewise, graduate students from master's and doctoral programs at the Graduate Center and from the Grove School of Engineering are integral members of CUNY ASRC research teams.

IlluminationSpace 
The CUNY ASRC's IlluminationSpace is an interactive education center that makes science accessible to New Yorkers of all ages and backgrounds. IlluminationSpace has welcomed high school field trips and offered free community hours. Currently, it offers a variety of virtual programs and resources for exploring the science that takes place at the CUNY ASRC.

The CUNY ASRC received a Public Interest Technology University Network 2021 Challenge Grant to establish the IlluminationSpace as a hub for public interest technology, STEM pathways, and science communications and outreach at CUNY. The goal of the funding is to better serve New York City's underrepresented communities by applying a community-informed approach to democratize STEM and sustain impact. It will tap a diverse range of experts and lived experiences to build an ecosystem of engagement and exchange that benefits NYC's BIPOC communities and the CUNY STEM community.

Community Sensor Lab 
The CUNY ASRC Community Sensor Lab is a workshop series that teaches high school students and community members how to build low-cost, DIY sensors that can monitor aspects of the environment, from the level of carbon dioxide and pollutants in the air to acidity in the soil and water.

Faculty opportunities 
The CUNY ASRC offers a seed grant program to fund collaborative research that supports tenured and tenure-track faculty at CUNY colleges. The program started in 2015 and currently awards six one-year, $20,000 grants annually.

In addition, the center's National Science Foundation CAREER Bootcamp Program, which guides tenure-track faculty through the proposal writing process, have helped CUNY researchers secure substantial NSF CAREER grants.

Grants and research 
Between 2014 and 2019, CUNY ASRC researchers secured 126 grants totaling $61 million. Several recent grants have set records for CUNY and the CUNY Graduate Center. Faculty, postdoctoral fellows, and graduate students at the CUNY ASRC also hold several patents. Professor Kevin Gardner, director of the CUNY ASRC Structural Biology Initiative, was instrumental in the identification of hypoxia-inducible factor 2-alpha (HIF-2α) as a druggable target and the drug development efforts that led to the FDA-approved first-in-kind kidney cancer drug from Merck, belzutifan.

Center for Advanced Technology – Sensor CAT 
The CUNY ASRC is home to one of 15 Centers for Advanced Technology (CATs) designated by Empire State Development NYSTAR. Funded by a nearly $8.8 million grant, the CUNY ASRC Sensor CAT spurs academic-industry partnerships to develop sensor-based technology. Developing biomedical and environmental sensors is a particular focus, as is finding new approaches to sensing through research in photonics, materials, and nanoscience.

Simons Collaboration 
Supported by a 2020 grant of up to $16 million from the Simons Foundation, a team of scientists, led by Professor Andrea Alù, director of the CUNY ASRC Photonics Initiative, is studying wave transport in metamaterials. The team's work could lead to greater sensing capabilities for the Internet of Things, improvements in biomedical applications, and extreme control of sound waves for medical imaging and wireless technology.

Department of Defense Vannevar Bush Faculty Fellowships 
Professors Rein Ulijn and Andrea Alù, the directors of the CUNY ASRC Nanoscience Initiative and the CUNY ASRC Photonics Initiative, each won a prestigious Vannevar Bush Faculty Fellowship from the U.S. Department of Defense. The fellowship is the agency's most prestigious single-investigator award.

Alù’s $3 million fellowship, awarded in 2019, support his efforts to develop new materials that enable extreme wave manipulation in the context of thermal radiation and heat management. Alù was also named the 2021 Blavatnik National Awards Laureate in Physical Sciences and Engineering.

Ulijn's $3 million fellowship, awarded in 2021, supports his work to understand how complex mixtures of molecules acquire functionality, and to repurpose this understanding to create new nanotechnology that is inspired by living systems.

Mina Rees Library 

The Mina Rees Library, named after former president Mina Rees, supports the research, teaching, and learning activities of the CUNY Graduate Center by connecting its community with print materials, electronic resources, research assistance and instruction, and expertise about the complexities of scholarly communication. Situated on three floors of the CUNY Graduate Center, the library is a hub for discovery, delivery, and digitization, as well as a place for solitary study. The library offers many services, including research consultations, a 24/7 online chat service with reference librarians, and workshops and webinars on using research tools.

The library also serves as a gateway to the collections of other CUNY libraries, the New York Public Library (NYPL), and libraries worldwide. It participates in a CUNY-wide book delivery system and offers an interlibrary loan service to bring materials from outside CUNY to Graduate Center scholars. The main branch of NYPL is just a few blocks up Fifth Avenue, and NYPL's Science, Industry and Business Library is just around the corner inside the B. Altman Building. CUNY Graduate Center students and faculty are NYPL's primary academic constituents, with borrowing privileges from NYPL research collections. NYPL's participation in the Manhattan Research Library Initiative (MaRLI) extends borrowing privileges for CUNY Graduate Center students to NYU and Columbia libraries as well.
 
The Mina Rees Library is a key participant in the CUNY Graduate Center's digital initiatives. It supports the digital scholarship of students and faculty, and promotes the understanding, creation, and use of open access literature. Among its special collections is the Activist Women's Voices collection, an oral history project focused on unheralded New York City community-based women activists.

Cultural venues 
The CUNY Graduate Center houses three performance spaces and two art galleries. The Harold M. Proshansky Auditorium, named for the institution's second president, is located on the concourse level and contains 389 seats. The Baisley Powell Elebash Recital Hall, located on the first floor, seats 180. The Martin E. Segal Theatre, also located on the first floor, seats 70.

James Gallery 
The ground floor of the CUNY Graduate Center houses the Amie and Tony James Gallery, also known as the James Gallery, which is overseen by the Center for the Humanities. The intention of the James Gallery is to bring scholars and artists into dialog with one another, as well as serve as a site for interdisciplinary research. The James Gallery hosts numerous exhibitions annually, and has hosted solo exhibitions by notable American and international artists such as Alison Knowles and Dor Guez.

CUNY TV and NYC Media

CUNY TV 
The University's citywide cable channel CUNY TV broadcasts on cable and WNYE's digital terrestrial television subchannel 25.3. Its production studios and offices are located on the first floor, while the broadcast satellite dishes reside on the building's ninth floor (rooftop).

NYC Media 
Sharing CUNY TV's main facilities is NYC Media, which is the official broadcast network and media production group of the NYC Mayor's Office of Media and Entertainment. The group includes WNYE-FM (91.5) radio station and WNYE-TV television channel (Channel 25), which also puts out “NYCLife” programming on 25.1 and “NYCGov” on 25.2 all broadcast 24/7 from within the building.

Academics

Rankings 
The latest edition of U.S. News & World Report Best Graduate School Ranking ranked CUNY Graduate Center's PhD program in Criminal Justice 15th, its English program 17th, its Sociology PhD program 26th, its History PhD program 26th, and its Mathematics PhD program 47th best in the nation. In the 2016 edition of QS World University Rankings, CUNY Graduate Center's PhD program in Philosophy was ranked 44th globally. In the 2022 edition of the Philosophical Gourmet Report ranked CUNY Graduate Center's philosophy program 14th best in the United States and 16th best in English-speaking countries.

Faculty 
Faculty members include the recipients of the Nobel Prize, Pulitzer Prize, the National Humanities Medal, the National Medal of Science, the Schock Prize, the Bancroft Prize, Grammy Awards, the George Jean Nathan Award for Dramatic Criticism, Guggenheim Fellowships, the New York City Mayor's Award for Excellence in Science and Technology, the Presidential Early Career Awards for Scientists and Engineers, and memberships in the American Academy of Arts and Sciences and the National Academy of Sciences. Many departments are recognized internationally for their level of scholarship.

Courses in the social sciences, humanities, and mathematics, and courses in the sciences requiring no laboratory work convene at the Graduate Center. Due to the consortial nature of doctoral study at the CUNY Graduate Center, courses requiring laboratory work, courses for the clinical doctorates, and courses in business, criminal justice, engineering, and social welfare convene on CUNY college campuses.

Community 
The CUNY Graduate Center pioneered the CUNY Academic Commons in 2009 to much praise. The CUNY Academic Commons is an online, academic social network for faculty, staff, and graduate students of the City University of New York (CUNY) system. Designed to foster conversation, collaboration, and connections among the 24 individual colleges that make up the university system, the site, founded in 2009, has quickly grown as a hub for the CUNY community, serving in the process to strengthen a growing group of digital scholars, teachers, and open-source projects at the university. The project has received awards and grants from the Alfred P. Sloan Foundation, the Sloan Consortium and was the winner of the 2013 Digital Humanities Award. It continues to be in the forefront of scholarly social media.

Also affiliated with the institution are four University Center programs: CUNY Baccalaureate for Unique and Interdisciplinary Studies through which undergraduates can earn individualized bachelor's degrees by completing courses at any of the CUNY colleges; the CUNY School of Professional Studies and the associated Joseph S. Murphy Institute for Worker Education and Labor Studies; the CUNY Graduate School of Journalism, which offers a master's degree in journalism; and Macaulay Honors College.

Research
CUNY Graduate Center describes itself as "research-intensive," and is classified by the Carnegie Classification of Institutions of Higher Education to be an R1 or have "highest research activity." The CUNY Graduate Center's primary library, named after Mina Rees, is located on campus; however, its students also have borrowing privileges at the remaining 31 City University of New York libraries, which collectively house 6.2 million printed works and over 300,000 e-books. Beginning in 1968, the CUNY Graduate Center maintains a formal collaboration with the New York Public Library that allows faculty and students access to NYPL's extensive research collections, regular library resources, as well as three research study rooms located in the Stephen A. Schwarzman Building. Further, students have access to the libraries of Columbia University and New York University through the NYPL's Manhattan Research Library Initiative. The CUNY Graduate Center library also maintains an online repository called CUNY Academic Works, which hosts open-access faculty and student research.

Advanced Research Collaborative (ARC)
The CUNY Graduate Center's Advanced Research Collaborative (ARC) program conducts research in seven core areas of study:
 Inequality - Research on the structural foundations of increasing inequality across our society and ways to mobilize communities around various alternatives.
 Immigration - Interdisciplinary research on the social, cultural, and political impacts of international migration, with special attention on the role of immigration in New York City and comparative studies on how immigration and ethnic diversity are experienced in different nations.
 Multilingualism - Interdisciplinary research on complex social, cultural, and policy issues raised by multilingualism.
 Digital Initiatives: Research in a broad range of digital projects and digital resources, including data mining and the digital humanities.
 Urban Studies: Critical issues facing large cities around the world and the role played therein by public, nonprofit, and business organizations.

Initiatives and committees
The CUNY Graduate Center does additional work through its initiatives and committees:
 Futures Initiative
 Graduate Center Digital Initiatives
 Initiative for the Theoretical Sciences (ITS)
 Revolutionizing American Studies Initiative
 The Committee for the Study of Religion
 The Committee on Globalization and Social Change
 The Committee for Interdisciplinary Science Studies
 Endangered Language Initiative
 Intellectual Publics

Centers and institutes
With over 30 research institutes and centers the CUNY Graduate Center produces work on a range of social, cultural, scientific and civic issues.

 Advanced Science Research Center
 American Social History Project/Center for Media and Learning
 Barry S. Brook Center for Music Research and Documentation
 Bildner Center for Western Hemisphere Studies
 Center for Jewish Studies
 Center for Advanced Study in Education (CASE)
 Center for Human Environments
 Center for Latin American, Iberian, and Latino Cultures
 Center for Place, Culture and Politics
 Center for the Humanities
 Center for the Study of Culture, Technology and Work
 Center for the Study of Women and Society
 Center for Urban Education Policy
 Center for Urban Research
 Center on Philanthropy and Civil Society
 CLAGS: The Center for LGBTQ Studies
 CIDR: CUNY Institute for Demographic Research
 CUNY Institute for Software Design and Development (CISDD)
 European Union Studies Center
 Foundation for Iberian Music
 Gotham Center for New York City History
 Henri Peyre French Institute
 Howard Samuels Center
 Human Ecodynamics Research Center
 Institute for Language Education in Transcultural Context
 Institute for Research on the African Diaspora in the Americas & the Caribbean (IRADAC)
 Latin/Greek Institute
 Leon Levy Center for Biography
 Middle East and Middle Eastern American Center (MEMEAC)
 Martin E. Segal Theatre Center
 Ralph Bunche Institute for International Studies
 Research Center for Music Iconography
 Research Institute for the Study of Language in Urban Society (RISLUS)
 Saul Kripke Center
 Stone Center on Socio-Economic Inequality
 Teaching and Learning Center
 The Writers' Institute at The Graduate Center

American Social History Project 
The American Social History Project/Center for Media and Learning (ASHP/CML) was established in 1981 to create and disseminate materials that help with understanding the diverse cultural and social history of the United States. Founded by Stephen Brier and Herbert Gutman, who sought to teach the history of everyday Americans, early projects included the film 1877: The Grand Army of Starvation, about the 1877 railway strike. 

ASHP has created curriculum grounded in the work of Howard Zinn, Herbert Gutman, and Stephen Brier which aims to teach social studies at the high school level with the inclusion of diverse viewpoints, including indigenous groups, enslaved Americans, immigrants, and the working class. Notable curricula and teaching tools have included Freedom's Unfinished Revolution: An Inquiry into the Civil War and Reconstruction, and Who Built America? . Other curriculum, such as Golden Lands, Working Hands, has focused on labor history; these types of ASHP materials emphasize collaborative teaching and learning strategies and have been popular in teaching districts that prioritize union labor. 

Digital teaching resources created by ASHP have included the History Matters website; and the online resource Liberté, Égalité, Fraternité: Exploring the French Revolution. As teaching tools, these websites place an emphasis on inclusion of primary source material for use in the classroom, alongside teaching strategies for seamless use of these documents in classroom curriculum. The online resource, September 11 Digital Archive, has received acclaim for its comprehensive representation of historic perspectives. ASHP is also a partner of the Mission US project and co-produced Mission US: Cheyenne Odyssey, an award-winning video game about a Cheyenne tribesman whose way of life is challenged by western expansion.

ASHP was established out of the success of a series of National Endowment for the Humanities summer seminars; seminar topics have included Learning to Look: Teaching Humanitites with Visual Images and New Media, Visual Culture of the American Civil War and its Aftermath, and LGBTQ+ Histories of the United States. This focus on professional development opportunities for educators has included other workshops such as the Bridging Historias: Latino/a History and Culture in the Community College Classroom program.

Stone Center on Socio-Economic Inequality 
The James M. and Cathleen D. Stone Center on Socio-Economic Inequality was launched on September 1, 2016. The Stone Center expanded and replaced the Luxembourg Income Study (LIS) Center, which opened its doors at the Graduate Center in 2009. It began a post-doctoral program in 2019.

The Stone Center has hosted several scholarly convenings. One year after its launch, it hosted the 2017 Meeting Of The Society For The Study Of Economic Inequality (ECINEQ). In 2021, it convened wealth inequality scholars for the two-day conference, From Understanding Inequality to Reducing Inequality.

Notable people

The CUNY Graduate Center has graduated 15,000 alumni worldwide, including numerous academics, politicians, artists, and entrepreneurs. As of 2016, the CUNY Graduate Center counted five MacArthur Foundation Fellows among its alumni, including writer Maggie Nelson as the most recent recipient. Among alumni graduated between 2003 and 2018, more than two-thirds are employed at educational institutions and over half have remained within New York City or its metro area.

Among the CUNY Graduate Center's alumni are leading scholars across numerous disciplines, including art historian and ACT-UP activist Douglas Crimp, political scientist Douglas Hale, anthropologist Faye Ginsburg, sociologist Michael P. Jacobson, historian Maurice Berger, and philosopher Nancy Fraser. The City University of New York has been acknowledged for its exceptional number of faculty and students who have been awarded nationally recognized prizes in poetry. Among this group include student Gregory Pardlo, winner of the 2015 Pulitzer Prize for Poetry

The CUNY Graduate Center holds a reputation for attracting established scholars to its faculty. In 2001, the CUNY Graduate Center initiated a five-year faculty recruitment campaign to hire additional renowned academics and public intellectuals in order to bolster the institution's faculty roster. Those recruited during the drive include André Aciman, Jean Anyon, Mitchell Duneier, Victor Kolyvagin, Robert Reid-Pharr and Saul Kripke.

The CUNY Graduate Center utilizes a unique consortium model, which hosts 140 faculty with sole appointments at the CUNY Graduate Center, most of whom are senior scholars in their respective disciplines, as well as draws upon 1,800 faculty from across the other CUNY schools to both teach classes and advise graduate students.

Notable faculty members include:

 Writer André Aciman
 Poet Ammiel Alcalay 
 Sociologist Stanley Aronowitz
 Political scientist Frances Fox Piven
 Anthropologist Talal Asad
 Biophysicist William Bialek
 Art historian Claire Bishop
 Musicologist Barry S. Brook
 Literary historian Mary Ann Caws
 Composer John Corigliano
 English professor Cathy Davidson
 Music theorist Philip Ewell
 Spanish professor Paul Julian Smith
 Geographer Ruth Wilson Gilmore
 Economist Michael Grossman (economist)
 Geographer David Harvey
 Historian Ervand Abrahamian
 Historian Dagmar Herzog
 Historian James Oakes
 Historian David Nasaw
 Art historian David Joselit
 Physicist Michio Kaku
 Poet Wayne Koestenbaum
 Mathematician Victor Kolyvagin
 Economist Paul Krugman
 Literary critic Eric Lott
 Economist Branko Milanović
 Social psychologist Stanley Milgram
 Feminist theorist and memoirist Nancy K. Miller
 Literary critic Robert Reid-Pharr
 Literary historian and biographer David S. Reynolds
 Mathematician Dennis Sullivan
 Computer Scientist Robert Haralick

Student life 
Students at the CUNY Graduate Center have the option of living in Graduate housing, located in East Harlem. The eight story building includes a gym, laundry facilities, lounge and rooftop terrace with views of the Midtown skyline. The Graduate housing was opened in the Fall of 2011 in conjunction with the construction of the Hunter College School of Social Work.

The Doctoral and Graduate Students' Council (DGSC) is the sole policy-making body representing students in doctoral and master's programs at the CUNY Graduate Center.

There are over forty doctoral student organizations ranging from the Middle Eastern Studies Organization and Africana Studies Group to the Prison Studies Group and the Immigration Working Group. These chartered organizations host conferences, publish online magazines, and create social events aimed at fostering a community for CUNY Graduate Center students.

Doctoral students at the CUNY Graduate Center also produce a newspaper funded by the DGSC and run by a committee of editors from the various doctoral programs. The paper, entitled The GC Advocate, comes out six times per academic year and is free of charge for students, faculty, staff, and visitors.

References

External links

 
Graduate Center
Universities and colleges in Manhattan
University art museums and galleries in New York City
34th Street (Manhattan)